(), also known as spaghetti bruciati, is a Barese spaghetti dish. Its preparation is markedly different from other spaghetti dishes; instead of being boiled in salted water and finished in sauce, the pasta is cooked directly on the pan (traditionally cast iron). A broth typically made of tomato sauce diluted with water is gradually added to the pan as the pasta absorbs it, similar to a risotto. As the spaghetti absorbs the sauce, it cooks directly on the pan surface, developing significant browning and a distinctive, crispy texture unique among pasta dishes.

History
According to Felice Giovine, a historian of Apulian cuisine, spaghetti all'assassina originates from Al Sorso Preferito, a restaurant in the city centre of Bari.

History outside of Italy 
Spaghetti all'assassina was virtually unknown outside of Italy, until the American YouTube channel Pasta Grammar released the first English-language recipe online on November 15, 2020.

Preparation
Spaghetti all'assassina is similar in preparation to pasta risottata , pasta prepared in the style of risotto, that is, cooked directly in broth. The broth used for spaghetti all'assassina typically consists of a 1:1 to 2:1 ratio of water and tomato sauce; less water is required if the tomato sauce is obtained by blending fresh tomatoes in a food processor. Unlike other pasta risottata dishes, the spaghetti is allowed to directly touch the surface of the pan before additional doses of the broth are added. This causes the spaghetti to fry and char, contributing to its crispy texture. Bronze-cut pasta is generally not recommended for spaghetti all'assassina, as it releases too much starch during cooking, interfering with its browning. Spaghetti all'assassina is often spicy: crushed red pepper, chili powder, or fresh chilies are added to it during cooking or used as a garnish.

See also
List of Italian dishes
 List of pasta dishes

References

External links
Spaghetti all'assassina

Spaghetti dishes
Cuisine of Apulia